Dendroiketes is a genus of earwigs, in the family Apachyidae. It is one of only two genera in Apachyidae. It has been cited by Henrik Steinmann in his book, The Animal Kingdom, and by G. K. Srivastava in Fauna of India, Part II.

References

External links 
 The Earwig Research Centre's Dendroiketes database Instructions: type Dendroiketes in the "genus" field and click "search".

Dermaptera genera
Forficulina